Calcutta Homoeopathic Medical College & Hospital, established in 1881, is a homeopathic medical college and hospital in Kolkata, West Bengal, India. It is the oldest homoeopathic medical college in India. It offers the Bachelor of Homeopathic Medicine and Surgery (BHMS) and MD (Homoeopathy) courses. This college is recognized by the National Commission for Homoeopathy (CCH), Ministry of Ayush and affiliated with the West Bengal University of Health Sciences.

History
This Institute is the oldest Homoeopathic college in the world. It was declared as a State Model Homoeopathic Institution since the 2005.

See also
List of hospitals in India

References

External links
 

1881 establishments in India
Educational institutions established in 1881
Homeopathic hospitals
Hospitals established in 1881
Universities and colleges in Kolkata
Hospitals in West Bengal
Homoeopathic Medical Colleges in West Bengal
Affiliates of West Bengal University of Health Sciences